Nachyn Sergeyevich Kuular (born 9 June 1995 in Tuva republic) is a breakdancer and freestyle wrestler from Russia of Tuvan heritage. World champion U23 and Senior European bronze medalist 2019.

Career

Background
Kuular was born 9 June 1995 in Kyzyl, Russia. Nachyn started practising wrestling at the age of 7 under his first wrestling coach Aidan Samdan. He is four-times champion at Tuva regional freestyle wrestling championships.

High school years
In 2013 he finished the Russian junior nationals 13th, then he competed at Russian senior nationals 2013, finishing there 28th. After high school he joined Mindiashvili's wrestling academy and won the Siberian Federal District freestyle wrestling championships at 60 kilos.

College years
In 2015, Kuular won the Junior European championships at 60 kilos, in the final match beating Selim Kozan of Turkey by technical superiority (13–2). After failing to qualify for the Olympics he won the Russian U23 World Team Trials, then he competed at the U23 World Championships where he won gold by defeating Indian World senior bronze medalist Bajrang Punia.

In 2016 he began studying at the Tuvan State University.

At the Golden Grand Prix Ivan Yarygin 2018 he won the bronze medal with 4–1 record at 65 kilos.

Freestyle record

! colspan="7"| Senior Freestyle International Matches
|-
!  Res.
!  Record
!  Opponent
!  Score
!  Date
!  Event
!  Location
|-
! style=background:white colspan=7 | 
|-
|Loss
|65–14
|align=left| Akhmed Chakaev
|style="font-size:88%"|0–3
|style="font-size:88%" rowspan=2|March 11–14, 2021
|style="font-size:88%" rowspan=2|2021 Russian National Freestyle Wrestling Championships
|style="text-align:left;font-size:88%;" rowspan=2|
 Ulan-Ude, Russia
|-
|Win
|65–13
|align=left| Artur Badtiev
|style="font-size:88%"|9–3
|-
! style=background:white colspan=7 |
|-
|Win
|64–13
|align=left| Nyamdorj Battulga
|style="font-size:88%"|4–1
|style="font-size:88%" rowspan=5|January 23–26, 2020
|style="font-size:88%" rowspan=5|2020 Ivan Yarygin Golden Grand Prix
|style="text-align:left;font-size:88%;" rowspan=5|
 Krasnoyarsk, Russia
|-
|Loss
|63–13
|align=left| Kurban Shiraev
|style="font-size:88%"|1–1
|-
|Win
|63–12
|align=left| Akhmed Chakaev
|style="font-size:88%"|9–4
|-
|Win
|62–12
|align=left| Baatarkhuu Usukhbayar
|style="font-size:88%"|2–0
|-
|Win
|61–12
|align=left| Munkh Erdene Altansuvd
|style="font-size:88%"|TF 11–0
|-
! style=background:white colspan=7 |
|-
|Loss
|60–12
|align=left| Haji Aliyev
|style="font-size:88%"|4–5
|style="font-size:88%" rowspan=2|November 29–30, 2019
|style="font-size:88%" rowspan=2|2019 Alrosa Team Cup
|style="text-align:left;font-size:88%;" rowspan=2|
 Moscow, Russia
|-
|Win
|60–11
|align=left| Kumba Mbunde
|style="font-size:88%"|
|-
! style=background:white colspan=7 |
|-
|Loss
|59–11
|align=left| Gadzhimurad Rashidov
|style="font-size:88%"|2–5
|style="font-size:88%" rowspan=5|July 5–7, 2019
|style="font-size:88%" rowspan=5|2019 Russian National Freestyle Wrestling Championships
|style="text-align:left;font-size:88%;" rowspan=5|
 Sochi, Russia
|-
|Win
|59–10
|align=left| Dzhokhar Dudayev
|style="font-size:88%"|4–3
|-
|Win
|58–10
|align=left| Muslim Sadulaev
|style="font-size:88%"|12–3
|-
|Win
|57–10
|align=left| Yulian Gergenov
|style="font-size:88%"|2–1
|-
|Win
|56–10
|align=left| Khizri Jamaludinov
|style="font-size:88%"|FF
|-
! style=background:white colspan=7 |
|-
|Win
|55–10
|align=left| Maxim Saculţan
|style="font-size:88%"|4–0
|style="font-size:88%" rowspan=5|April 8–9, 2019
|style="font-size:88%" rowspan=5|2019 European Continental Championships
|style="text-align:left;font-size:88%;" rowspan=5|
 Bucharest, Romania
|-
|Win
|54–10
|align=left| Husein Shakhbanau
|style="font-size:88%"|4–2
|-
|Loss
|53–10
|align=left| Haji Aliyev
|style="font-size:88%"|3–5
|-
|Win
|53–9
|align=left| Vladimer Khinchegashvili
|style="font-size:88%"|9–4
|-
|Win
|52–9
|align=left| George Bucur
|style="font-size:88%"|6–0
|-
! style=background:white colspan=7 |
|-
|Loss
|51–9
|align=left| Akhmed Chakaev
|style="font-size:88%"|1–2
|style="font-size:88%" rowspan=4|January 24–27, 2019
|style="font-size:88%" rowspan=4|Golden Grand Prix Ivan Yarygin 2019
|style="text-align:left;font-size:88%;" rowspan=4|
 Krasnoyarsk, Russia
|-
|Win
|51–8
|align=left| Tulga Tumur Ochir
|style="font-size:88%"|6–0
|-
|Win
|50–8
|align=left| Batmagnai Batchuluun
|style="font-size:88%"|11–9
|-
|Win
|49–8
|align=left| Ivan Guidea
|style="font-size:88%"|TF 14–2
|-
! style=background:white colspan=7 |
|-
|Win
|48–8
|align=left| Artur Badtiev
|style="font-size:88%"|6–2
|style="font-size:88%" rowspan=4|December 7–9, 2018
|style="font-size:88%" rowspan=4|2018 Alans International
|style="text-align:left;font-size:88%;" rowspan=4|
 Vladikavkaz, Russia
|-
|Win
|47–8
|align=left| Viktor Rassadin
|style="font-size:88%"|4–1
|-
|Loss
|46–8
|align=left| Kurban Shiraev
|style="font-size:88%"|1–6
|-
|Win
|46–7
|align=left| Vladimer Khinchegashvili
|style="font-size:88%"|DQ (12–6)
|-
! style=background:white colspan=7 |
|-
|Win
|45–7
|align=left| Peyman Biabani
|style="font-size:88%"|5–0
|style="font-size:88%" rowspan=2|December 2, 2018
|style="font-size:88%" rowspan=2|2018 Alrosa Team Cup
|style="text-align:left;font-size:88%;" rowspan=2|
 Moscow, Russia
|-
|Win
|44–7
|align=left| Amiran Vakhtangashvili
|style="font-size:88%"|10–2
|-
! style=background:white colspan=7 |
|-
|Win
|43–7
|align=left| Dyulustan Bulatov
|style="font-size:88%"|5–0
|style="font-size:88%" rowspan=5|August 3–5, 2018
|style="font-size:88%" rowspan=5|2018 Russian National Freestyle Wrestling Championships
|style="text-align:left;font-size:88%;" rowspan=5|
 Odintsovo, Russia
|-
|Loss
|42–7
|align=left| Bekkhan Goygereyev
|style="font-size:88%"|1–3
|-
|Win
|42–6
|align=left|
|style="font-size:88%"|
|-
|Win
|41–6
|align=left| Akhmedkhan Dzaliev
|style="font-size:88%"|5–0
|-
|Win
|40–6
|align=left| Viktor Rassadin
|style="font-size:88%"|6–2
|-
! style=background:white colspan=7 |
|-
|Win
|39–6
|align=left| Anvarbek Dalgatov
|style="font-size:88%"|TF 11–0
|style="font-size:88%" rowspan=4|June 4–10, 2018
|style="font-size:88%" rowspan=4|2018 U23 European Championships
|style="text-align:left;font-size:88%;" rowspan=4|
 Istanbul, Turkey
|-
|Win
|38–6
|align=left| Utku Dogan
|style="font-size:88%"|TF 14–2
|-
|Win
|37–6
|align=left| Evgheni Volcov
|style="font-size:88%"|TF 13–2
|-
|Win
|36–6
|align=left| Ilman Mukhtarov
|style="font-size:88%"|8–3
|-
! style=background:white colspan=7 |
|-
|Win
|35–6
|align=left| Hyeon Song
|style="font-size:88%"|Fall
|style="font-size:88%" rowspan=4|May 14–20, 2018
|style="font-size:88%" rowspan=4|2018 Military World Championships
|style="text-align:left;font-size:88%;" rowspan=4|
 Moscow, Russia
|-
|Win
|34–6
|align=left| Peiman Biabant
|style="font-size:88%"|4–4
|-
|Win
|33–6
|align=left| Aghahuseyn Mustafayev
|style="font-size:88%"|6–4
|-
|Win
|32–6
|align=left| Kevin Henkel
|style="font-size:88%"|13–5
|-
! style=background:white colspan=7 |
|-
|Win
|31–6
|align=left| Batmagnai Batchuluun
|style="font-size:88%"|TF 12–2
|style="font-size:88%" rowspan=5|January 27, 2018
|style="font-size:88%" rowspan=5|Golden Grand Prix Ivan Yarygin 2018
|style="text-align:left;font-size:88%;" rowspan=5|
 Krasnoyarsk, Russia
|-
|Win
|30–6
|align=left| Logan Stieber
|style="font-size:88%"|10–4
|-
|Loss
|29–6
|align=left| Ilyas Bekbulatov
|style="font-size:88%"|5–12
|-
|Win
|29–5
|align=left| Edemi Bolkvadze
|style="font-size:88%"|TF 10–0
|-
|Win
|28–5
|align=left| Josh Kindig
|style="font-size:88%"|TF 12–1
|-
! style=background:white colspan=7 |
|-
|Win
|27–5
|align=left| Bajrang Punia
|style="font-size:88%"|TF 17–6
|style="font-size:88%" rowspan=5|November 21–26, 2017
|style="font-size:88%" rowspan=5|2017 U23 World Championships
|style="text-align:left;font-size:88%;" rowspan=5|
 Bydgoszcz, Poland
|-
|Win
|26–5
|align=left| Heorhi Kaliyeu
|style="font-size:88%"|5-3
|-
|Win
|25–5
|align=left| Tulga Tumur Ochir
|style="font-size:88%"|TF 14–4
|-
|Win
|24–5
|align=left| Joseph McKenna
|style="font-size:88%"|TF 10–0
|-
|Win
|23–5
|align=left| Maxim Saculțan
|style="font-size:88%"|2–1
|-
! style=background:white colspan=7 |
|-
|Loss
|22–5
|align=left| Viktor Rassadin
|style="font-size:88%"|TF 0–11
|style="font-size:88%" rowspan=4|October 28–29, 2017
|style="font-size:88%" rowspan=4|2017 Yugra Cup – Vladimir Semenov Memorial
|style="text-align:left;font-size:88%;" rowspan=4|
 Nefteyugansk, Russia
|-
|Win
|22–4
|align=left| Elbrus Bolotaev
|style="font-size:88%"|10–3
|-
|Win
|21–4
|align=left| Abdula Akhmedov
|style="font-size:88%"|11–3
|-
|Win
|20–4
|align=left| Ildar Shakurov
|style="font-size:88%"|TF 15–3
|-
! style=background:white colspan=7 |
|-
|Win
|19–4
|align=left| George Bucur
|style="font-size:88%"|TF 12–1
|style="font-size:88%" rowspan=4|September 20–23, 2017
|style="font-size:88%" rowspan=4|2017 Military World Championships
|style="text-align:left;font-size:88%;" rowspan=4|
 Klaipėda, Lithuania
|-
|Win
|18–4
|align=left| Aghahuseyn Mustafayev
|style="font-size:88%"|8–8
|-
|Win
|17–4
|align=left| Nashri Mehran
|style="font-size:88%"|TF 16–4
|-
|Win
|16–4
|align=left| Raymond Bunker
|style="font-size:88%"|TF 11–0
|-
! style=background:white colspan=7 |
|-
|Loss
|15–4
|align=left| Semen Tereshenko
|style="font-size:88%"|2–8
|style="font-size:88%" rowspan=5|April 29–30, 2017
|style="font-size:88%" rowspan=5|2017 Mongolia Open
|style="text-align:left;font-size:88%;" rowspan=5|
 Ulaanbaatar, Mongolia
|-
|Win
|15–3
|align=left| Aleksei Borovitski
|style="font-size:88%"|18–18
|-
|Win
|14–3
|align=left| Narmandakhyn Lkhamgarmaa
|style="font-size:88%"|TF 15–3
|-
|Win
|13–3
|align=left| Askhat Clyamkhanov
|style="font-size:88%"|10–7
|-
|Win
|12–3
|align=left| Burtsev Vair
|style="font-size:88%"|6–0
|-
! style=background:white colspan=7 |
|-
|Loss
|11–3
|align=left| Viktor Rassadin
|style="font-size:88%"|3–12
|style="font-size:88%" rowspan=5|January 27–29, 2017
|style="font-size:88%" rowspan=5|Golden Grand Prix Ivan Yarygin 2017
|style="text-align:left;font-size:88%;" rowspan=5|
 Krasnoyarsk, Russia
|-
|Loss
|11–2
|align=left| Akhmed Chakaev
|style="font-size:88%"|0–3
|-
|Win
|11–1
|align=left| Egor Ponomarev
|style="font-size:88%"|TF 11–0
|-
|Win
|10–1
|align=left| Shamil Rashidov
|style="font-size:88%"|10–8
|-
|Win
|9–1
|align=left| Islam Dudaev
|style="font-size:88%"|8–6
|-
! style=background:white colspan=7 |
|-
|Win
|8–1
|align=left| Vasyl Shuptar
|style="font-size:88%"|14–11
|style="font-size:88%" rowspan=4|September 19–25, 2016
|style="font-size:88%" rowspan=4|2016 Military World Championships
|style="text-align:left;font-size:88%;" rowspan=4|
 Skopje, North Macedonia
|-
|Win
|7–1
|align=left| Tian Zhenguang
|style="font-size:88%"|TF 11–0
|-
|Win
|6–1
|align=left| Maris Stals
|style="font-size:88%"|TF 10–0
|-
|Win
|5–1
|align=left| Mandeep
|style="font-size:88%"|TF 10–0
|-
! style=background:white colspan=7 |
|-
|Loss
|4–1
|align=left| Aleksandr Bogomoev
|style="font-size:88%"|0–7
|style="font-size:88%" rowspan=5|January 22–26, 2015
|style="font-size:88%" rowspan=5|Golden Grand Prix Ivan Yarygin 2015
|style="text-align:left;font-size:88%;" rowspan=5|
 Krasnoyarsk, Russia
|-
|Win
|4–0
|align=left| Bulat Batoyev
|style="font-size:88%"|3–2
|-
|Win
|3–0
|align=left| Yegor Ponomarev
|style="font-size:88%"|3–2
|-
|Win
|2–0
|align=left| Vasiliy Struchkov
|style="font-size:88%"|3–2
|-
|Win
|1–0
|align=left| Gamlet Ramonov
|style="font-size:88%"|TF 16–5
|-

Personal life
Kuular likes German cars, he has BMW 3.

He is an active soldier of the Russian Ground Forces.

A fan of Xöömej (Tuvin national songs) and hip-hop music.

His favorite wrestler is Opan Sat.

References

1995 births
Living people
Russian male sport wrestlers
Tuvan people
People from Kyzyl
European Wrestling Championships medalists
Breakdancers